Prince Rashid — was a governor of Derbent during invasions of Jebe and Subutai. He was a younger brother of Shirvanshah Gushtasb I. He defended the city against Mongol armies successfully and forced them to pass Caucasus via alternative ways. He failed to defend himself against fleeing Kipchaks, but he managed to retake the city, and put them to death.

Prince Rashid is a character that appears on Tom Shanley's novel, Dominion: Dawn of the Mongol Empire.

References

Links
 Tom Shanley - Dominion: Dawn of the Mongol Empire, 2008

Shirvanshahs
13th-century Iranian people
People from Derbent